Zek may refer to:

 Achmet Zek, a character from the serial film Tarzan the Tiger
 Centre for the Study of the Causes of the War (Zentralstelle zur Erforschung der Kriegschuldfrage), a think-tank based in Berlin
 Zek, a character from the TV series Star Trek: Deep Space Nine
 Zek, a term for prisoners in Soviet Gulags
 Zentralstelle für Kreditinformation, a Swiss organisation centralizing and listing every credit attached to someone

See also
 Arnold Zeck, a supporting character from the fiction starring Nero Wolfe